Mike Eerdhuijzen (born 13 July 2000) is a Dutch professional footballer who plays as a centre back for Sparta Rotterdam.

Club career
Eerdhuijzen played in the youth department of FC Volendam until 2018, where he signed a contract until 2022. From 2017, he began playing for Jong FC Volendam in the Derde Divisie. 

He made his debut in the first team of FC Volendam on 19 April 2019, in the 2–3 loss at home against NEC. He came on as a substitute for Darryl Bäly in the 68th minute.

On 18 August 2021, Eerdhuijzen became unwell during practice, but subsequent examinations at the hospital showed, that he did not suffer from heart issues.

On 31 January 2022, Eerdhuijzen signed a contract with Sparta Rotterdam, effective 1 July 2022.

International career
In November 2018, Eerdhuijzen was called up for the Netherlands under-20 team by coach Bert Konterman for the friendlies against Switzerland and Italy. He made his international debut – his only match to date – for the Netherlands youth team on 15 November 2018 in the 3–1 away win over Switzerland U20, coming on as a substitute in the 70th minute for Shaquille Pinas.

Career statistics

Honours
Jong Volendam
Derde Divisie – Sunday: 2018–19

References

External links

2000 births
Living people
Dutch footballers
Association football defenders
FC Volendam players
Sparta Rotterdam players
Eerste Divisie players
Tweede Divisie players
Derde Divisie players
People from Volendam
Footballers from North Holland
Netherlands youth international footballers